William Henry Timlin (May 28, 1852August 21, 1916) was an American lawyer and judge.  He was a justice of the Wisconsin Supreme Court for the last ten years of his life.

Biography

Born in Mequon, Wisconsin. His father was an Irish American immigrant who had served as Treasurer of Washington County, Wisconsin, which then also included all of Ozaukee County.  His mother died when he was six, and his father, who volunteered for the Union Army, disappeared during the American Civil War.  Thus Timlin was raised, from age nine, by his uncle, who was a farmer struggling with financial hardship.

He worked on his uncle's farm but got little formal education.  His uncle died during his teenage years, and more hardship followed.  He studied surveying and stenography and taught school to make money.  At age 25, he was employed as a stenographer at the Wisconsin Circuit Court in Kewaunee, Wisconsin.

Timlin studied law under G. G. Sedgwick, and later H. G. and W. J. Turner, and was admitted to the State Bar of Wisconsin in 1878.  He practiced law in Kewaunee, where he also served as superintendent of the public schools.  He later moved to Milwaukee, Wisconsin, where he carried on his legal career.

In 1906, he was elected to a newly created seat on the Wisconsin Supreme Court.  He did not run for re-election in 1916, but died four months before the end of his term.

Electoral history

| colspan="6" style="text-align:center;background-color: #e9e9e9;"| General Election, April  1906

Notes

External links

|-

People from Mequon, Wisconsin
Wisconsin lawyers
Justices of the Wisconsin Supreme Court
1852 births
1916 deaths
19th-century American judges
19th-century American lawyers